Shukk() (also known as Shak), is a 2013 Pakistani mystery drama, aired on ARY Digital, and directed by Yasir Nawaz. It starred Adeel Hussain, Sanam Saeed and Ayesha Khan in the leading roles while Syed Jibran played a pivotal role. The drama was a big hit and includes in the highest rated Pakistani serials.

Plot
The story revolves around Sehrish and Ehtishaam, a happy couple. Suddenly, Sania, the once fiance of Ehtishaam arrives in their neighborhood.

Cast
 Adeel Hussain as Ehtisham
 Sanam Saeed as Sania
 Ayesha Khan as Sehrish
 Syed Jibran as Ali
 Shamim Hilaly as Sania's aunt
 Badar Khalil as Sania's mother
 Ayesha Khan as Kulsoom
 Meher Jaffri
 Syed Wajdan Shah
 Birjees Farooqui as Sherish's aunt
 Bilal Khan (child star) as roman

Production
The role of Ehtisham was earlier offered to Fawad Khan but due to his ongoing projects in India he rejected it.

Broadcast
The show was also aired in India on Zindagi (TV channel) premiering in January 2016. It also aired on ARY Zindagi.

Accolades 
 Nominated - 14th Lux Style Awards - Best Television Director - Yasir Nawaz

References

External links

  

2013 Pakistani television series debuts
2013 Pakistani television series endings
Pakistani drama television series
Urdu-language television shows
Television shows set in Karachi
ARY Digital original programming